Robert Hutchinson is the name of:

 Robert Hutchinson (author) (born 1957), American author and essayist
 Robert Hutchinson (Australian politician) (1857–1918), from Western Australia
 Robert Hutchinson (Canadian politician) (1802–1866), from Prince Edward Island
 Robert Hutchinson (historian), author of The Last Days of Henry VIII
 Bob Hutchinson (1894 – 1971), English footballer
 Bob Hutchinson (athlete) (born 1931), Canadian Olympic sprinter
 Robert Hutchinson (missing person), a man from Hendon, Sunderland in England who disappeared on 23 June 2014

See also
Robert Hutchison (disambiguation)
Bobby Hutcherson (1941–2016), jazz musician